Chilo ikri is a moth in the family Crambidae. It was described by Thomas Bainbrigge Fletcher in 1928. It is found in India.

References

Chiloini
Moths described in 1928